Day Deborah Rica Lipford, now known as Dr. Day Gardner, is a former Miss Atlantic City, (1974) who served as Miss Delaware 1976 and made history by becoming the first African American contestant to place as a top ten semi-finalist at the Miss America 1977 pageant.

Raised in the Elwood section of Mullica Township, New Jersey, graduated from Oakcrest High School in Hamilton Township, Atlantic County, New Jersey in 1973.

She was President and Director of Lipford Corporation.  Her main achievement was the thematic and interior design the SandCastle Entertainment Complex, a $40 million dinner theater and nightclub facility located in the center of Guam's thriving tourist district.

Gardner worked as a media consultant KUAM Broadcasting in Ordot, Guam and upon returning to the U.S. Mainland was an on-air personality and producer with African Broadcasting at the World Trade Center in New York City.

She is the former National Director of Black Americans for Life, in Washington, D.C., (an outreach of National Right to Life Committee).

In 2017, she was nominated by Maryland Governor Larry Hogan to be a consumer member of the Maryland Board of Physicians. On March 15, 2017, she was pressured by the Maryland Senate over her pro-life views. The governor's office withdrew the nomination due to criticism  from Democrats the Governor received regarding Gardner's pro life stance and how doctors should face the issue.

Presently, Gardner is the founder and President of The National Black Pro Life Union and Associate Director of National Pro-Life Center on Capitol Hill.

She was also the anchor for the 'Daily Life News with Day Gardner' program for NPLR.net online and later host of 'The Day Report' for American Family Radio.

In January 2011, Day Gardner received a Doctorate Degree from the Faith Evangelical College and Seminary in Tacoma, Washington.

Dr. Gardner's first novel, If Not For Grace was published in the spring of 2011 and is available in book stores and online.

The 60s Soul singer Hoagy Lands was her uncle, and her first cousin is the mother of singer Jaheim.

References

External links
 Official website
 National Pro-Life Action Center on Capitol Hill

Living people
American anti-abortion activists
Miss America 1977 delegates
Oakcrest High School alumni
People from Mullica Township, New Jersey
University of Delaware alumni
Year of birth missing (living people)
20th-century American people
Female models from New Jersey
African-American female models
20th-century African-American women
20th-century African-American people
21st-century African-American people
21st-century African-American women